On July 30, 2016, sixteen people were killed when the hot air balloon they were riding in struck power lines, crashed and caught fire in the unincorporated community of Maxwell, near Lockhart, Texas,  south of the state capital Austin. It is the deadliest ballooning disaster to ever occur in the United States.

Aircraft
The aircraft involved was a Kubicek BB85Z hot air balloon, registration N2469L. The balloon was operated by the Heart of Texas Balloon Ride company, which served people in the Greater Austin area.

Accident
The balloon departed from Fentress Airpark at 06:58 local time (11:58 UTC) on Saturday, July 30, 2016. It was carrying the pilot and fifteen passengers. At 07:42, the aircraft struck power lines and crashed into a field near Lockhart, Texas. All sixteen people on board were killed. The emergency services were alerted at 07:44 about a "possible vehicle accident", and arrived at the scene to find the basket of the balloon on fire.

A witness described hearing two "pops" which were thought to be a gun going off. Reports said that the balloon lost contact about half an hour into the scheduled one-hour flight.

Investigation
The Federal Aviation Administration and the National Transportation Safety Board (NTSB) led the investigation into what was designated a "major accident" by the NTSB. The Federal Bureau of Investigation (FBI) also secured evidence for the NTSB's investigation. Fourteen personal electronic devices (cellphones, an iPad, and cameras) were recovered from the wreckage. These were turned over to the FBI for the recovery of evidence. The NTSB held an investigative hearing into the accident in December 2016.

In October 2017, the NTSB determined the accident was caused by the pilot's "pattern of poor decision-making" that led him to launch the balloon (on a day when other balloon operators cancelled their planned flights because of low cloud and fog), to continue the flight into fog and above clouds, and then to descend near clouds which made it difficult to see and avoid obstacles. The pilot's medical conditions (depression and ADHD), the prescription drugs he was taking, and the fact that balloon pilots do not need a medical certificate even for commercial flights were contributing factors leading to the accident.

Aftermath
On August 1, Heart of Texas Hot Air Balloon Rides, whose owner died in the accident, announced that it would be suspending operations. More than two years later on September 27, 2018, the House of Representatives approved new legislation that would mandate medical exams for commercial balloon pilots.

See also
List of ballooning accidents
2012 Carterton hot air balloon crash -- a very similar accident where poor pilot decision-making resulted in balloon colliding with power lines

References

External links
Heart of Texas Hot Air Balloon Rides homepage

2016 in Texas
Accidents and incidents involving balloons and airships
Aircraft fires
Aviation accidents and incidents in Texas
Aviation accidents and incidents in the United States in 2016
Aviation accidents and incidents caused by pilot error
Caldwell County, Texas
July 2016 events in the United States